i-Techie is a weekly Dawn News programme covering all aspects of science and technology, with segments as far-reaching as the latest sci-films and special effects in Hollywood, the latest solar-powered gadgets, and even the effects of pollution on the gender dynamics of swallows. Each episode is packed with information ranging from the quirky to the cutting edge, delivered to the audience by witty and tech-friendly hosts.

Pakistani television series